The Åland Social Democrats is a social-democratic political party on the Åland Islands. In the 2019 parliamentary election, the party won 9.1% of the popular vote and 3 out of 30 seats, a loss of two.

The current organisation was founded in 1971, although there have been worker's associations on Åland since 1906. After the independence of Finland, the Social Democrats were closer to the Swedish Social Democratic Party than the Social Democratic Party of Finland. After the Second World War, the Social Democrats fought the supporters of the far-left Finnish People's Democratic League, which briefly became the largest political movement on the islands.

Election results

References

External links 
Official web site 

Political parties in Åland
Social democratic parties in Europe
Centre-left parties in Europe
Socialist parties in Finland